Bazguiyeh (also Romanized as Bazgūīyeh) is a village in Shabkhus Lat Rural District, Rankuh District, Amlash County, Gilan Province, Iran. At the 2006 census, its population was 203, in 57 families.

References 

Populated places in Amlash County